In organic chemistry, a sulfonanilide  group is a functional group found in certain organosulfur compounds. It possesses the chemical structure , and consists of a sulfonamide group where one of the two nitrogen substituents (R' or R") is a phenyl group. It can be viewed as a derivative of aniline.

References

Functional groups
Sulfonamides